The 4th constituency of Vendée is a French legislative constituency in the Vendée département. Like the other 576 French constituencies, it elects one MP using the two-round system, with a run-off if no candidate receives over 50% of the vote in the first round.

Description

Philippe de Villiers resigns on October 24, 1994. Bruno Retailleau is elected on November 26, 1994 in a by-election.
Philippe de Villiers resigned on 19 July 2004 to sit in the European Parliament. Véronique Besse is elected  on January 23, 2005 in a by-election.

Deputies

Election results

2022

 
 
 
 
 
 
 
|-
| colspan="8" bgcolor="#E9E9E9"|
|-

2017

 
 
 
 
 
 
|-
| colspan="8" bgcolor="#E9E9E9"|
|-

2012

2007

2002

 
 
 
 
 
|-
| colspan="8" bgcolor="#E9E9E9"|
|-

1997

References 

4